The Elmira Coca-Cola Bottling Company Works is located at 415 West Second Street, Elmira, New York.  It was built in 1939 in the Art Moderne style.  The building was designed by architect Lucius Read White, Jr. The structure is significant for its architecture and its role in industry, and was added to the National Register of Historic Places in 1997.

The building is no longer a bottling plant and now used by International Brotherhood of Electrical Workers Local 139.

Gallery

See also
 Coca-Cola Bottling Company Building (Columbia, Missouri)
 Coca-Cola Bottling Plant (Ocala, Florida)

References

Industrial buildings and structures on the National Register of Historic Places in New York (state)
Industrial buildings completed in 1939
Coca-Cola buildings and structures
Streamline Moderne architecture in New York (state)
Buildings and structures in Elmira, New York
National Register of Historic Places in Chemung County, New York